Kirlampudi is a village in Kakinada district of the Indian state of Andhra Pradesh. It is located in Kirlampudi mandal of Peddapuram revenue division.

References 

Villages in Kirlampudi mandal